is a sub-kilometer asteroid and fast rotator, classified as a near-Earth object of the Apollo group, approximately 50 meters in diameter. It was first observed on 30 September 2014, by the Mount Lemmon Survey at an apparent magnitude of 21 using a  reflecting telescope. With an absolute magnitude of 24.3, the asteroid is about 37–85 meters in diameter.

Description 
But with an observation arc of 10 days, the nominal (best fit) orbit showed that on 24 October 2014 the asteroid would pass  (1.5 LD) from Earth and even further from the Moon. The asteroid peaked at apparent magnitude 13.5, placing it in the range of amateurs with roughly  telescopes.

It was removed from the Sentry Risk Table on 10 October 2014 using JPL solution #5 with a 10-day observation arc.

It was observed by Goldstone radar on 24–25 October 2014.

References

External links 
 Near-Earth Asteroid 2014 SC324: an exceptional movie (Virtual Telescope Project 25 October 2014)
 
 
 

Minor planet object articles (unnumbered)

Discoveries by MLS
20141024
20140920